The Welshman (established in 1832) was a weekly 'radical' English language Welsh newspaper, reporting local and national news and information. It was published in Carmarthen and distributed in the Cardiganshire area and through much of South Wales.

From 1840 to 1942 it was known as The Welshman and general advertiser for the Principality of Wales, reverting to its original name in 1942.

In the late 1940s the paper was bought by the owners of the Carmarthen Journal .  The Welshman ceased publication in 1984.

There are 2,032 issues of the paper (from 1835 to 1910) free online at the National Library of Wales.

References

Newspapers published in Wales
Newspapers established in 1835
Publications disestablished in 1984
1835 establishments in Wales
1984 disestablishments in Wales